Little One is a 2012 South African drama film directed by Darrell Roodt. The film was selected as the South African entry for the Best Foreign Language Oscar at the 85th Academy Awards, but it did not make the final shortlist.

Plot
Set in South Africa, the  story follows a middle aged woman named Pauline, who finds a battered child on the road. She takes the child to the hospital where she is treated. Then she takes the child away to find out why the child became a victim of violence.

Cast
 Lindiwe Ndlovu as Pauline
 Vuyelwa Msimang as Little One (Vuyelwa)
 Mutodi Neshehe as Detective Morena
 Nompumelelo Nyiyane as Nurse
 Luzuko Nqeto as Jacob
 Vicky Kente as Florence
 Vusi Msimang as Vusi
 Richard Lukunku as Detective # 2
 Tami Baleka as Matron
 Sarah kozlowski as Social Worker
 Jonathan Taylor as Doctor
 Samela Tyelbooi as ICU Nurse

See also
 List of submissions to the 85th Academy Awards for Best Foreign Language Film
 List of South African submissions for the Academy Award for Best Foreign Language Film

References

External links
  

2012 films
2012 drama films
Zulu-language films
Films directed by Darrell Roodt
South African drama films